Emma Louise Boughton (born 27 November 1970), better known as Emma B, is a radio presenter in the UK.

Early career
Boughton's childhood was spent in Canada before she moved to Birmingham, England as a teenager. She graduated from the University of Exeter with a BA in English and Drama, staying on as a sabbatical officer organising all the live events and skiing competitively for the university. She came seventh in the giant slalom in the British university championships.

Her first experience with radio was at the age of seven as part of a drama on BBC Radio Oxford with Timmy Mallett. She worked at Radio Caroline (at Bristol dock) before writing articles for media magazines, which included Kerrang!. She also presented a daily children's show along with Timmy Mallet at Radio Oxford, where she was called Susan Zinc.

Personal life 

Boughton got married on 8 November 2003. She has two children who were both born in London, one being an actress and musician and the other a dancer.

BBC
Boughton joined BBC Radio 1 in April 1998, presenting an early Saturday morning show from 4am to 7am. In 1999, she took over the Saturday afternoon show from 1pm to 3pm alongside Sara Cox and the Sunday night/Monday morning overnight slot from 1am to 4am. In addition to that, in January 2000, she co-presented the Sunday Surgery show, alongside Dr. Mark Hamilton every Sunday evening from 9pm to 11pm. Sunday Surgery has dealt with social and health problems including sex, drugs, poverty and crime. She won four Sonys for the show and has been singled out as having saved lives through the show.

In September 2001, Boughton took over Saturday Breakfast from 7am to 10am as well as the Sunday Surgery show. She continued with Saturday Breakfast until late 2003. From 2004 to 2005, she also presented on BBC Radio 6 Music, filling in for various presenters such as Liz Kershaw, Gideon Coe, Vic McGlynn and Jane Gazzo. She has also presented Top of the Pops for the BBC World Service.

Heart 106.2
Boughton eventually quit Radio 1 in early 2005 and in August 2005 joined London's Heart 106.2, presenting a Sunday evening show from 7pm to 10pm. She then took over the weekday drivetime show alongside fellow DJ Greg Burns, and then moved to the 4pm7pm slot alone. Her show was the first female solo show to ever take the number one spot on the drivetime slot in the London area. During her time at Heart she also occasionally presented shows for its sister station LBC as well as the BBC's Five Live service. She left Heart at the end of July 2009 to move with her family to Ibiza.

Other work
Boughton was the voiceover for the safety video of former British charter airline Thomsonfly. She joined Magic Radio to cover Angie Greaves' afternoon show in November 2016. She hosted her own show on Saturday 10-1pm before taking over from Greaves for the host of the weekday afternoon slot 1-4pm on Magic Radio in September 2019.

In February 2020, Boughton began hosting Macmillan Cancer Support's podcast, Talking Cancer.

TV career
Boughton has presented various youth programmes on television including The Base on ITV and "Hype" on BBC Choice. She also occasionally appears on GMTV. She narrated a few series of ITV's Club Reps, which was made by STV Productions.

References

External links
Afternoons with Emma B on Magic Radio
An Interview with Emma B
Emma B: my greatest mistake

1970 births
English radio personalities
English television presenters
Living people
People from Oxford
British radio DJs
Alumni of the University of Exeter
People educated at King Edward VI Handsworth